The Sheraton Addis is an international hotel located in Addis Ababa, Ethiopia. It is part of Marriott's Luxury Collection. It has 293 rooms, as well as a number of villas.

Profile
The hotel was built by MIDROC Ethiopia, and designed by architect Kosek Ivo. Sheik Mohammed Hussein Al Amoudi, built the hotel as a way of creating jobs and promoting the country's image- saying that he is "investing in Ethiopia by following my heart, not my head".  The hotel cost over $200 million to build, and over 500 families had to be relocated for its construction.   It opened on 28 February 1998, and has been considered one of the country's leading hotels.  The hotel is located between two palaces, the National Palace (formerly the Jubilee Palace), which is the residence of the President of Ethiopia, and the Menelik Palace, residence of the Prime Minister of Ethiopia.

The hotel has hosted countless high-profile events, including Pan-African and African Union summits, as well as New Year's Eve celebrations with special performances by world-renowned artists such as Beyonce, Ludacris, The Black Eyed Peas, Rihanna and Akon, among other guests.

The hotel has been host to a number of celebrities, including the aforementioned performers; indeed, most, if not all, choose to stay in the Sheraton when in Ethiopia, according to The Independent. Among the many guests include Tony Blair, Rita Marley, Princess Anne, Jimmy Carter, and Bill Clinton. 

Confusingly, the Sheraton Addis is not part of the Sheraton Hotels and Resorts hotel chain, but rather is a part of The Luxury Collection. Since it was built, the hotel has been part of The Luxury Collection. There are two other remaining hotels that are part of The Luxury Collection but that operate with the name Sheraton, but not technically part of Sheraton—the Sheraton Grande Sukhumvit (Bangkok, Thailand) and Sheraton Kuwait (Kuwait City, Kuwait).

In 2018, following the acquisition of Starwood by Marriott International, the Reporter newspaper reported the hotel's name would be changed to the Marriott Addis. However, this was later denied by hotel management.

Labour dispute
In February 2011, a labour dispute over compensation threatened to close the hotel. In late 2010, a union was formed at the hotel, and in December got involved in a dispute of the distribution of profits from service charges. The workers, who were already the most well-paid hotel employees in the country, taking home 5,337 Ethiopian Birr (US$283) on average per month, felt that the sharing of the service charges was not sufficient.  The union argued that management should be excluded from the proceeds which would increase salaries by 52 birr. Sheik Hussein said that he felt "unappreciated and unrecognised" for his "generosity to employees of the hotel", and threatened to close the hotel for expansion work. The crisis was solved before the 15 February deadline.

Expansion plans
42 hectares across two districts- Kirkos and Arada, was acquired by the hotel in 2004 for an expansion project, that would contain retail, a mosque, and 8050 apartments. The program was stalled, however, due to the city's inability to find funds to relocate the over 3,000 households that were to be displaced by the project. In 2010 MIDROC gave the municipality 151 million birr to expedite the process. As of 2013, the land has been cleared but construction has not begun.

An additional 5 hectares has been set aside for the construction of a new 9-story hotel wing of 25,000 m2 containing extended stay apartments. Also included are villas, bungalows, as well as a 31,400 m2 health centre, in response to guest complaints about the paucity of health facilities. The health center will contain Olympic and outdoor tennis courts, an olympic swimming pool, restaurants, a soccer pitches, and a basketball court. This project is projected to cost $127 million. As of 2013, construction has begun on the health centre.

Features

The hotel has over 1,500 square meters of function space over 11 conference rooms, allowing for a capacity of 1,500 person at events.  The hotel provides an array of dining options including Italian, French, Indian restaurants, as well as a poolside restaurant and all-day dining international restaurant with 5 bars and lounges.

The hotel's health club, the Aqva Club, includes outdoor swimming pools, sauna, massage and Jacuzzi. A special feature of the pool is its underwater music. Within the Aqva Club is also found the special Simba Club, the children's playground. However, the health club has been criticised in many reviews as having minimal facilities, leading to expansion plans.

The hotel has a nightclub, called The Gaslight. The Sheraton Addis is the only hotel in Ethiopia to have a water treatment plant using an ultra-violet water sterilization system, which ensures sterilization and bacteria free purification of water. It has a number of generators, meaning that the hotel is never affected by the power cuts and load shedding that plague Addis Ababa.

References

External links

Official website
Interview with Jean-Pierre Mangioff, manager of the Sheraton Addis

Buildings and structures in Addis Ababa
Hotels in Ethiopia
Sheraton hotels
Hotels established in 1998
Hotels in Addis Ababa
Hotel buildings completed in 1998
20th-century architecture in Ethiopia